The mixed doubles tournament at the 1993 French Open was held from 24 May until 6 June 1993 on the outdoor clay courts at the Stade Roland Garros in Paris, France. Andrei Olhovskiy and Eugenia Maniokova won the title, defeating Danie Visser and Elna Reinach in the final.

Seeds

Draw

Finals

Top half

Section 1

Section 2

Bottom half

Section 3

Section 4

External links
1993 French Open – Doubles draws and results at the International Tennis Federation

Mixed Doubles
French Open by year – Mixed doubles